Steven Farrell (born 6 February 1980) is an Australian former cricketer. He played two first-class matches for Queensland in 2003. He is now an umpire and stood in a tour match between Ireland and Queensland XI in Brisbane in January 2016.

References

External links
 

1980 births
Living people
Australian cricketers
Australian cricket umpires
Queensland cricketers
Sportspeople from Townsville